André de la Simone (11 September 1907 – 29 October 1967) was a French equestrian. He competed in two events at the 1952 Summer Olympics.

References

1907 births
1967 deaths
French male equestrians
Olympic equestrians of France
Equestrians at the 1952 Summer Olympics
People from Douai
Sportspeople from Nord (French department)